The Way to Love is a 1933 American pre-Code romantic comedy film directed by Norman Taurog and starring Maurice Chevalier and Ann Dvorak. Edward Everett Horton was the principal featured player.

At one stage Carole Lombard was to have co starred against Chevalier.

Filming started 9 January 1933.

Cast
Maurice Chevalier
Ann Dvorak
Edward Everett Horton
Minna Gombell
Blanche Frederici
John Miljan
Grace Bradley
George Rigas

Plot
Chevalier portrays a "happy-go-lucky Parisian street gypsy" who protects Dvorak's character when she is threatened by her partner in a knife-throwing act.

References

External links

1933 films
1933 romantic comedy films
1930s English-language films
Films directed by Norman Taurog
American romantic comedy films
American black-and-white films
Paramount Pictures films
1930s American films